Charles Alden may refer to:

 Charles E. Alden, obscure inventor who was claimed to have created the idea of a vest pocket telephone
 Charles Henry Alden (1836–1906), member of the United States Medical Corps
 Ted Ray (comedian) (1905–1977), English comedian, born Charles Olden